James August Comiskey (October 16, 1926 – February 1, 2005) was a United States district judge of the United States District Court for the Eastern District of Louisiana.

Education and career

Born in New Orleans, Louisiana, Comiskey was in the United States Army during World War II, from 1944 to 1946. He received a Bachelor of Arts degree from Loyola University New Orleans in 1949 and a Juris Doctor from Loyola University New Orleans College of Law in 1951. He was in private practice in New Orleans from 1951 to 1967.

Federal judicial service

On January 16, 1967, Comiskey was nominated by President Lyndon B. Johnson to a new seat on the United States District Court for the Eastern District of Louisiana created by 80 Stat. 75. He was confirmed by the United States Senate on March 2, 1967, and received his commission on March 4, 1967. Comiskey served in that capacity until his resignation on June 15, 1975.

Post judicial service

Comiskey was thereafter in private practice in New Orleans until his death in that city on February 1, 2005.

References

Sources
 

1926 births
2005 deaths
20th-century American judges
Judges of the United States District Court for the Eastern District of Louisiana
Loyola University New Orleans alumni
Loyola University New Orleans College of Law alumni
United States Army personnel of World War II
United States district court judges appointed by Lyndon B. Johnson